The Women's National Basketball Association's (WNBA) blocks title is awarded to the player with the highest blocks per game (bpg) average in a given season. The highest league-leading block-leader was Brittney Griner's 129 in 2014.

See also
List of National Basketball Association career blocks leaders
List of National Basketball Association season blocks leaders

External links 
 WNBA Year-by-Year Leaders and Records for Blocks Per Game by Basketball-Reference.com

Lists of Women's National Basketball Association players
Women's National Basketball Association statistics